The Agents of Atlas are a fictional superhero team appearing in American comic books published by Marvel Comics. The first lineup was composed of characters originally appearing in unrelated stories published in the 1950s by Marvel's predecessor company, Atlas Comics. The characters debuted as a team in What If #9 (June 1978) and starred in the 2006 limited series Agents of Atlas, written by Jeff Parker and with art by Leonard Kirk.

In 2019, the team's lineup was revamped as a new team made up of Asian and Asian American superheroes as The New Agents of Atlas, written by Greg Pak and art by Gang Hyuk Lim.

Publication history
 
This group of heroes, which was not a team in 1950s comics, was established through retroactive continuity as having been formed in the 1950s. They originally appeared as a group in the alternate-universe story What If #9 (June 1978) and then reappeared in Avengers Forever (1998–2000 miniseries), in which they and their reality were destroyed.

The limited series Agents of Atlas #1–6 (Oct. 2006 – March 2007) was set in the present day and likewise set in mainstream continuity. The series emerged from what writer Parker called "a huge editorial hunch" at Marvel, and said the revival of the characters "is something that [editor] Mark Paniccia was looking at and [for which he] thought specifically of me, and asked me what I would do with it". Paniccia says the idea came to him when he picked up a copy of the What if? story and found the cover "intriguing".

The team made a brief appearance in "The Resistance", an eight-page story that was part of the Secret Invasion crossover story arc. Parker and editor Paniccia said in July 2008, that the former will write an Agents of Atlas ongoing series which was one of the titles launched as part of the Dark Reign storyline. That series ended after eleven issues but the title relaunched as part of the "Heroic Age" under the title Atlas because, according to Parker, it not only makes for a smaller logo but it is a "natural progression to what most people call the book and the team". The series was canceled with Atlas #5.

During War of the Realms a new iteration of the Agents of Atlas debuted in the War of the Realms: Agents of Atlas mini-series. This new team, along with the classic roster, was featured together in a new, 5-issue Agents of Atlas limited series.

Characters
The original team, with the individual characters' debuts in chronological order, consists of:
 Namora – Marvel Mystery Comics #82 (May 1947)
 Venus – Venus #1 (Aug. 1948)
 Marvel Boy/the Uranian – Marvel Boy #1 (Dec. 1950)
 the Gorilla-Man – Men's Adventures #26 (Mar. 1954)
 M-11/the Human Robot – Menace #11 (May 1954)
 Jimmy Woo – Yellow Claw #1 (Oct. 1956)

Other characters from the original What if? story, such as Jann of the Jungle, made guest appearances. Parker explained that original What if? team-member the 3-D Man was left out "[b]ecause he wasn't really around in the 1950s" books, having been introduced in 1977 in Marvel Premiere, with stories set in the 1950s.

After the Agents of Atlas took over the Atlas Foundation, the following characters joined as Atlas Foundation members:
 Mr. Lao – Adviser to the Head of the Atlas Foundation. A dragon who was the Yellow Claw's adviser, now adviser to Jimmy Woo, the new Head of the Atlas Foundation.
 Temugin – Second in Command of the Atlas Foundation.
 Derek Khanata – Overseer of Atlas.
 At the end of the series, the contemporary 3-D Man was invited to join the team, and he did.

During the War of the Realms, Jimmy Woo recruited several of his teammates from the Asian American superhero team the Protectors as well as several new Asian superheroes to form The New Agents of Atlas to stop the Queen of Cinders invading the Asian continent. The current members consist of:
 Aero - Chinese heroine with wind-based powers.
 Brawn - Korean-American former Hulk and supergenius.
 Crescent and Io - South Korean heroine and her magical bear.
 Luna Snow - South Korean K-Pop idol with ice-based powers.
 Shang-Chi - the Master of Kung-Fu.
 Silk - Korean-American Spider-Man ally.
 Sword Master - Chinese mystical sword-wielding hero.
 Wave - Filipina water manipulator.
 White Fox - South Korean super spy and the last of the kumiho.

The Inhuman Pakistani-American superheroine Ms. Marvel was offered membership along with the other Protectors, but left to rejoin her original team the Champions in New York before she could accept the offer. M-41 Zu, a mystically enhanced android created by Jimmy and the Atlas foundation, briefly joined the team under the guise of the Hawaiian volcano goddess Pele. The Immortal Monkey King Sun Wukong of the Ascendants briefly assisted the team as well.

When most of the Agents are summoned to the portal city of Pan, they are introduced to the current Giant-Man, Raz Malhotra, who is informally recruited into Atlas by Amadeus when rejecting Mike Nguyen's offer to become Pan's protectors. Following the Atlantis Attacks storyline, Brawn and Shang-Chi leave the team while Issac Ikeda, the Protector of Pan, officially joins the team.

Fictional team biography
The group was formed in Spring 1958 by Federal Bureau of Investigation agent Jimmy Woo to rescue President Dwight D. Eisenhower from the villainous Yellow Claw. Woo first recruits Venus and Marvel Boy. He then tries to recruit Namora, who declines but tells Woo where to find a broken but potentially useful robot named M-11. While Marvel Boy fixes M-11, Woo asks Jann of the Jungle to take Marvel Boy to extend an invitation to the Gorilla-Man, who accepts Woo's offer. The group quickly rescues President Eisenhower and remains together for six months until the federal government, deciding the public is not ready for such a group, disbands it and classifies information about it.

Years later, Woo, by now a high-ranking agent of S.H.I.E.L.D., attempts a secret raid of a group identified as the Atlas Foundation. Going AWOL and taking several other willing agents with him, Woo invades an Atlas location, resulting in all of the recruits being killed. Woo himself is critically burned and loses his higher brain functions. The Gorilla-Man, by now also a S.H.I.E.L.D. agent, gives the organization a record of the 1950s team, of which S.H.I.E.L.D. had no knowledge, and rescues Woo with the aid of M-11 and Marvel Boy, who can only restore Woo to his 1958 self. Namora, whom the group believed dead, is located by the Agents and joins the group. The team learns M-11 is a double agent for the Yellow Claw, and that Venus is one of the legendary Sirens given flesh, not the Venus/Aphrodite of mythological legend.

Using M-11 as a beacon, the heroes find the Yellow Claw, who reveals his true identity, Plan Chu, an almost immortal Mongol khan who claims he orchestrated each of his battles with Woo only to establish Woo's worthiness to marry Suwan and succeed him as khan. Chu created Atlas to put Woo again in the spotlight. Woo accepts his destiny, takes over Atlas hoping to turn it into a force for good, and the Yellow Claw, having found his heir, appears to commit suicide. The team resurfaces in New York City, where together with Spider-Man, they defeat Temple of Atlas splinter cells still loyal to the Yellow Claw.

They later work as a resistance cell against the invasion of Earth by the shapeshifting aliens the Skrulls. Following the Skrulls' defeat and the rise of Norman Osborn to power, the Agents of Atlas decide to oppose Osborn's agenda by taking on the role of "supervillains." They attack Fort Knox and steal the gold reserve, which Osborn had planned on using to finance a secret weapons system.

The Agents of Atlas encounter (and battle) the Avengers, the X-Men, fight Norman Osborn's Thunderbolts. and later investigate an abandoned Thule Society headquarters during the events of Fear Itself.

 
During the War of the Realms event, Woo recruits his Protectors teammates Brawn, Shang-Chi, and Silk as the New Agents of Atlas before departing to defend Asia from Malekith's ally Queen Sindr and her Fire Goblin forces from Muspelheim.  While the team is in Seoul, Woo is briefly incapacitated, forcing Brawn to assume leadership of the team.  The Agents join forces with the Korean heroes White Fox, Crescent, Io and Luna Snow against Sindr. When the agents are forced to retreat, Brawn summons the Chinese heroes Sword Master and Aero, Filipina heroine Wave and the Hawaiian goddess of Fire and Volcanoes Pele from Shanghai to help assist in the fight against Sindr. With the assistance Sun Wukong of the Ascendants, the New Agents of Atlas are able to defeat Sindr and her army in Northern China, although Sun Wukong and "Pele" (who reveals herself to be M-41 Zu, a mystically enhanced Android created by the Atlas Foundation) are killed in the process. Sindr flees using the Black Bifrost, only for the Agents to follow her with Brawn's teleporter, where they help Captain Marvel defeat her and her remaining forces at the Great Wall of China near Beijing. After Malekith's defeat, the Agents are seen in Shanghai looking on while the captured Fire Goblins are escorted back to Muspelheim.

Following the War of the Realms, the New Agents of Atlas and Giant-Man are inadvertently summoned to Pan, a city of portals created by tech mogul Mike Nguyen linking major Asian and Pacific cities and enclaves into a single borderless metropolis. Despite the team's mistrust of Nguyen and the Protector of Pan, Issac Ikeda, a mercenary under Nguyen's employ, they decide to help protect Pan and its citizens after the city is attacked by wyverns and sea serpents and several Madripoorian refugees are harassed by Nguyen's Pan Guard. With Woo having mysteriously lost contact with the team following Pan's activation, Brawn has the New Agents investigate Nguyen and the Big Nguyen Company while continuing to protect Pan. Brawn reluctantly allows help from Ikeda, who also has his own suspicions of Nguyen. It is later revealed that the team's actions are being monitored by Woo and Mr. Lao, who are testing them for their capabilities. During their investigations, a photograph of Woo and Nguyen together is uncovered while the New Agents discover that the Big Nguyen Company have imprisoned an Atlantean dragon and have been harvesting her magical scales to power Pan's portals. Nguyen downplays his relationship with Woo, explaining that Pan and Atlas had previously signed a non-aggression treaty (which the New Agents just violated) but warns that freeing the dragon would disrupt Pan's portals while Woo and Lao order the team to release her immediately.  Before a decision can be made, an enraged Namor invades the city to reclaim his dragon from Pan.

Meanwhile, the original Agents of Atlantis are sent by Woo and Mr. Lao on a mission to Thailand where they encounter a dragon named Mr. Thong, who warns them of an upcoming Clash of Dragons. 

During the Atlantis Attacks storyline, Namor gives the New Agents one day to return Atlantis' dragon. After the skirmish, Jimmy introduces the original and new Agents of Atlas to each other. Both teams work together to safely release the dragon while keeping Pan's portals stable. Despite their success, the sea serpent goes berserk upon her return home.  Discovering an implant imbedded in her scales, Namor accuses Atlas of treachery and resumes his attack on Pan. To help the Agents defend Pan, Nguyen recruits the Sirenas, the longtime enemies of Atlantis. With the Sirenas' help, Namor is eventually subdued and imprisoned. The Sirenas, with Nguyen's support, propose a retaliatory attack against Atlantis. When Namora reveals that the dragon's implant was made from their tech, the Sirenas argue that the dragon had already wrought destruction for generations.  While the team disagrees on who to side with, Namor breaks free from his prison.  Brawn is able to talk down Namor and the Agents from fighting each other and confronts Woo for withholding secrets from the team. Woo reveals to them that for thousands of years, ancient dragons have served as advisors for human rulers. As fighting each other openly would raze the planet, dragons have used humans as proxies in their own personal conflicts against each other, making them responsible for almost every major war in history, including the on between Pan and Atlantis. Woo is content with this balance of power, but Nguyen suggests uniting the world under Pan, proposing to Namor and Woo that by harvesting the power of their dragons, they could overtake the rest of them. In a last ditch effort to destroy Atlantis, Nguyen places a Sirena tech implant on Brawn, transforming him into the Hulk and putting him under his control.  Namor and the Agents are able to stop the Hulk's rampage by removing the implant, but the shockwaves generated the Hulk's fight with Namor have created a massive tsunami that is heading towards the Heart of Pan. Namor and the Agents are able to weaken the tsunami and save the city, although a repentant Nguyen dies while protecting civilians. One month after the conflict, Atlantis and the Sirenas sign a non-aggression pact, recognizing Pan as an independent nation. Upset for being treated as Woo's pawns, Shang-Chi and Brawn leave the team while Ikeda is recruited by Woo. While Mr. Lao laments losing Brawn as a potential leader, he and Woo prepare the Agents to help Namor against the King in Black.

Temple of Atlas
As part of a viral marketing strategy to promote the series, fans could participate in an alternate reality game centered around the "Temple of Atlas" weblog on Marvel's website. There, readers received weekly prose excerpts of the exploits of Jimmy Woo and his team, and were given "missions" from the Temple's curator, the mysterious "Mr. Lao". The goal was to discover each week's keyword by following textual clues Lao would post on the messageboards of such comic book webzines as Newsarama and Comic Book Resources. They, along with IGN.com and Comics Bulletin, would also feature fake news posts that players would be led toward, containing more clues for finding keywords. Anagrams were regular, and on several occasions one keyword had to be taken "into the field" by going to a local comic shop and saying the phrase to the staff in order to receive a keyword in response. On two occasions, players were required to attend a Heroes Convention and the San Diego Comic-Con International to find keywords.

Other versions
In the Marvel Adventures: Avengers universe, a time travel story involved a 1958 version of the Agents of Atlas that found Captain America frozen in ice. The special was written by Jeff Parker and penciled by Leonard Kirk, same creative team as the Agents of Atlas miniseries.

In other media
 The Agents of Atlas appeared in Lego Marvel Superheroes 2 as DLC (downloadable content). It included the Gorilla-Man, the Uranian, Venus, Jimmy Woo, and M-11/the Human Robot.
 Jimmy Woo appears in media set in the Marvel Cinematic Universe, portrayed by Randall Park. The character debuted in the live-action film Ant-Man and the Wasp and appears in the live-action Disney+ series WandaVision.
 Shang-Chi appeared in media also set in the Marvel Cinematic Universe, portrayed by Simu Liu, and debuted in the live-action film Shang-Chi and the Legend of the Ten Rings, and will reappear in its sequel. The character will also appear in Marvel Zombies (TV series).
 Namora appears in Black Panther: Wakanda Forever, also set in the Marvel Cinematic Universe. And is portrayed by actress Mabel Cadena.
 Both Wave and Amadeus Cho will appear as Peter Parker's classmates in the animated MCU Disney+ series, Spider-Man: Freshman Year.

Collected editions

References

External links
 
Agents of Atlas at Marvel.com
 
 Agents of Atlas (vol. 1) at the Unofficial Handbook of Marvel Comics Creators
 
 WRITER VS. ARTIST: Jeff Parker Vs. Carlo Pagulayan, Comic Book Resources, April 15, 2009
 

Marvel Comics superhero teams
Marvel Comics titles